Michael Maschka (born 1962 in Augsburg) is a German painter, sculptor, graphic artist and designer. He is an artist of Fantastic Realism.

Life 
While growing up in Augsburg, Michael Maschka came into contact with Renaissance and Baroque art at an early age. Although he hardly received artistic impulses from his middle-class family environment he soon discovered his passion for drawing and painting. After he completed his artistic education at the Staatliche Fachoberschule Augsburg (technical college), Maschka went to Berlin in 1983. He began to study social pedagogy after he was rejected by the Berlin University of the Arts (UdK). This was his profession until 1993. At the same time he exhibited his works in Augsburg and Berlin. As a follower of Surrealism and Fantastic Realism he met his great idol the Austrian artist Ernst Fuchs, who was one of the founders of the Vienna School of Fantastic Realism, in 1994. Fuchs promoted Maschka. As his assistant Maschka worked with him on several projects such as the Fuchs' church in Thal near Graz. Since then he has participated in exhibitive projects in Europe and further afield. Until 2014 he was a member of "Dali's heirs", a group which was founded by Roger M. Erasmy in 2003, and celebrated successes in France and Germany with the Dali railway wagon. As one of the founders of Labyrinthe (Association for Phantastic and Visionary Arts, founded 2001), Michael Maschka has made it his goal to care for the life's work of Edgar Ende and to make it available to the public by means of exhibitions. In this framework he wants to bring young artists and promoters of Fantastic Realism together. Nowadays he lives in Nördlingen, Bavaria, Germany.

Work 
Michael Maschka is a representative of Fantastic Realism. The formal approach in his pictures is realistic and is influenced by the care that the Old Masters took. He meticulously applies the techniques of the Old Masters to underline the message in his pictures. The viewer should be beguiled by the puzzles that his fantastic pictures present and by the sensuality that is tangible. He uses the vocabulary of the visible reality to trace the invisible structures of a spiritual reality that he has perceived. The motif nudity which appears in many of his pictures does not represent a projection surface for sexuality but is a symbol for naturalness and vulnerability. The female figure appears in his pictures in the form of the anima, the unconscious side of the soul of the male. By means of painting and etching he tries to bring out the unveiled and vulnerable self and to present it pictorially. In doing so he wants to bring the inner and outer picture into harmony.

Maschka wants to sharpen the perception of the observer so that he looks behind the scenes of his personally constructed world. In his pictures Maschka often refers to motifs of German and Greek Mythology, because for him they include the universal language of the archetypes, a language which over thousands of years has remained uninfluenced by time and cultural influences and is understood intuitively by mankind. These motifs, that always rotate around the topics of destruction and renewal within nature or mankind, form a basic part of his pictorial language. This should lay bare conceptual approaches that have been long believed forgotten but have lived on in our subconscious. The symbolism of his pictures aims to cause the viewer to ponder and discover anew appreciation for the world that is not immediately available behind the visible reality.

Exhibitions (selection) 
 1994: Du Fantastique au Visionnaire, Le Zittele, Venice, Italy
 1997: An den Quellen der Phantastik, Galerie Villa Rolandseck, Remagen, Germany
 1998: Fantastic Realism, St. Petersburg Museum, Otaru, Japan
 2001: Mythen – Bilder verborgener Welten, Schloss Honhardt, Baden Württemberg, Germany
 2002: Parfums des femmes, 3. Biennale der Phantastischen Kunst, Saint-Germain-en-Laye, Paris, France
 2002: The Hart Gallery, Palm Desert, California, USA
 2003: Les héritiers de Dali, Espace Berthelot, Lyon, France
 2005: Hommage an H. Ch. Anderson, Schloss Voergaard, Denmark
 2005: Phantastische Welten, Zitadelle Spandau, Berlin, Germany
 2006: Salon de l'art fantastique européen, Les Thermes, Le Mont Dore, France
 2007: Dalis Erben malen Europa, Europäisches Parlament, Brussels, Belgium
 2007: Apokalypse, Musee d'Art Fantastique de Brussels, Belgium
 2008: Women of the world, Galerie Princesse de Kiev, Nice, France
 2009: International Peace Art Exhibition, Palacio Pignatelli, Barcelona, Spain
 2010: Plastica Narboria, Hotêl de Ville, Saint-Avold, France
 2010: Le Grand Palais, Paris, France
 2011:  SAFE 2011, Le Mont-Dore, France
 2011:  PhantaMorgana, Rathaus Viechtach, Germany
 2012: IMAGO-Phantastic Art, Schloss Riegersburg, Austria
 2012: Dalis Erben, Phantastenmuseum Vienna, Austria
 2013: Michael Maschka, Rathaushalle Kitzingen, Germany
 2013: Dalis Erben, Grand Palais, Paris, France
 2014: Ungleiche Geschwister, Trierenberg Art, Traun, Austria
 2015: Zwischen den Welten, Galerie CALLAS, Bremen, Germany

Awards 
 2007: Art Award of the City of Le Mont Dore, France
 2010: Bronce Medal of Société des artistes français, Grand Palais, Paris, France

Publications 
 Vom Sehen zum Schauen, 1998 (Monography).
 Der Meisterträumer, 2015 (Novel),

References

Further reading 
 Gerhard Habarta: Lexikon der phantastischen Künstler. Books on Demand GmbH, Norderstedt, Germany, 2010, 
 Kulturverein Kitzingen und Umgebung PAM e.V.: Michael Maschka. Exhibition Catalogue Book, Kitzingen, Germany, 2013
 FANTASMUS Artbooks: IMAGINAIRE VIII – Contemporary Magic Realism, Denmark, 2015,

External links 

 

20th-century German painters
20th-century German male artists
German male painters
21st-century German painters
21st-century German male artists
German contemporary artists
Fantastic realism
Fantastic art
1962 births
Living people
Artists from Augsburg